Nils John Nilsson (February 6, 1933 – April 23, 2019) was an American computer scientist. He was one of the founding researchers in the discipline of artificial intelligence. He was the first Kumagai Professor of Engineering in computer science at Stanford University from 1991 until his retirement. He is particularly known for his contributions to search, planning, knowledge representation, and robotics.

Early life and education 

Nilsson was born in Saginaw, Michigan, in 1933. He received his Ph.D. from Stanford in 1958, and spent much of his career at SRI International, a private research lab spun off from Stanford.

Nilsson served as a lieutenant in the U.S. Air Force from 1958 to 1961; he was stationed at the Rome Air Development Center in Rome, New York.

Career

SRI International 
Starting in 1966, Nilsson, along with Charles A. Rosen and Bertram Raphael, led a research team in the construction of Shakey, a robot that constructed a model of its environment from sensor data, reasoned about that environment to arrive at a plan of action, then carried that plan out by sending commands to its motors. This paradigm has been enormously influential in AI. Textbooks such as Introduction to Artificial Intelligence, Essentials of Artificial Intelligence, and the first edition of Artificial Intelligence: A Modern Approach show this influence in almost every chapter. Although the basic idea of using logical reasoning to decide on actions is due to John McCarthy, Nilsson's group was the first to embody it in a complete agent, along the way inventing the A* search algorithm and founding the field of automated temporal planning. In the latter pursuit, they invented the STRIPS planner, whose action representation is still the basis of many of today's planning algorithms. The subfield of automated temporal planning called classical planning is based on most of the assumptions built into STRIPS.

Stanford University 
In 1985, Nilsson became a faculty member at Stanford University, in the Computer Science Department. He was chair of the department from 1985 to 1990. He was the Kumagai Professor of Engineering  from the foundation of the Chair in around 1991 until his retirement, and remained Kumagai Professor Emeritus until his death.

He was the fourth President of the AAAI (1982–83) and a Founding Fellow of that organization. Nilsson wrote or coauthored several books on AI, including two that have been especially widely read - Principles of Artificial Intelligence (1982) and Logical Foundations of Artificial Intelligence (1987).

Awards and memberships 

In 2011, Nilsson was inducted into IEEE Intelligent Systems' AI's Hall of Fame for the "significant contributions to the field of AI and intelligent systems".

Personal life 

On July 19, 1958, Nilsson married Karen Braucht, with whom he had two children. Braucht died in 1991. In 1992 he married Grace Abbott, who had four children from a previous marriage.

Nilsson died on April 23, 2019, at his home in Medford, Oregon, at the age of 86.

Selected publications 
 .
 .
 .
 .
 .
 .

See also
 Morgan Kaufmann Publishers

References

External links 

Nilsson's home page

Oral history interview with Nils J. Nilsson, Charles Babbage Institute, University of Minnesota, Minneapolis. Nilsson gives an overview of DARPA-sponsored AI research at SRI, including his own work in robotics (especially during the period 1966-1971), research on the Computer Based Consultant, and related research on natural language and speech understanding. He describes the significance and relationship of robotics to the larger field of AI, particularly the intellectual problems it addressed and the enabling technologies it helped develop.

1933 births
2019 deaths
American people of Swedish descent
Artificial intelligence researchers
Fellows of the Association for the Advancement of Artificial Intelligence
People from Saginaw, Michigan
Presidents of the Association for the Advancement of Artificial Intelligence
SRI International people
Stanford University alumni
Stanford University School of Engineering faculty